Sinum perspectivum, common name the white baby ear, is a species of predatory sea snail, a marine gastropod mollusk in the family Naticidae, the moon snails.

Distribution
Sinum perspectivum is found on the eastern coast of America from Maryland south to Brazil, and also round Bermuda.

Description 
The maximum recorded shell length is 51 mm. It has a shallowly coiled shell with a wide opening and graceful curved outline. It is white both outside and inside. Like the other members of its family, it is carnivorous.

Habitat 
Minimum recorded depth is 0 m. Maximum recorded depth is 70 m.

References
 

Naticidae
Gastropods described in 1831